Diktepe is a village in the Batman District of Batman Province in Turkey. The village had a population of 776 in 2021.

The hamlet of Yeniköy is attached to the village.

References 

Villages in Batman District
Kurdish settlements in Batman Province